La bella Antonia, prima monica e poi dimonia, also known as Naughty Nun, is a 1972 Italian commedia sexy all'italiana directed by Mariano Laurenti.

Cast 
Edwige Fenech: Antonia
Piero Focaccia: Painter Claudio Fornari
Dada Gallotti: Domicilla
Riccardo Garrone: Giovanni Piccolomini  
Malisa Longo: Caterina
Luciana Turina: Madre badessa
Umberto D'Orsi: Domenico Mincaglia
Lucretia Love: Ippolita
Tiberio Murgia: Fra' Filippuccio
Elio Crovetto: Fra' Pomponio

References

External links

1972 films
Films directed by Mariano Laurenti
Commedia sexy all'italiana
1970s sex comedy films
Films scored by Berto Pisano
1970s Italian-language films
1970s Italian films